Thornthwaite is a village in Cumbria, England.

Thornthwaite may also refer to

Thornthwaite, North Yorkshire, England
C. W. Thornthwaite (1899-1963), American geographer
Jane Thornthwaite, Canadian politician